"Come Around" is the last song on Counting Crows' 2008 album Saturday Nights & Sunday Mornings.

Despite never issued as a physical single release, "Come Around" was serviced as an airplay single to the Adult Alternative radio format in summer 2008. It would go on to top the Billboard Triple A chart the week of September 27, 2008  (it remained the #1 single for three weeks) becoming the band's first chart-topper since "Accidentally in Love" in 2005.

Lead singer Adam Duritz reportedly was unhappy with the selection due to his belief that the decidedly more melodic mood of the track did not represent the mood of the album as a whole, preferring that a track from the edgier "Saturday Nights" half of the record be released instead.

Song meaning

In early 2008, Duritz explained the meaning of the song in a live band performance:

However, Duritz has denied forthright the song is about redemption, and rather suggests a lasting heartache from a failed relationship.

References

Counting Crows songs
2008 singles
Songs written by Adam Duritz
Songs written by Dan Vickrey
2008 songs
Geffen Records singles
Song recordings produced by Gil Norton
Songs written by David Bryson
Songs written by Charlie Gillingham
Songs written by David Immerglück
American rock songs